Michael Henke (born 27 April 1957) is a German football coach and a former player. He is the current caretaker of Arminia Bielefeld. His most notable post was managing 1. FC Kaiserslautern in the 2005–06 season for 14 games. He has spent much of his career working as assistant to Ottmar Hitzfeld. After spending the 2009 season with Köln, Henke moved to Iran in order to become Esteghlal's coach for the 2011–12 season. He was reunited with his former player, Ferydoon Zandi, whom he signed to 1. FC Kaiserslautern back in 2005. On 15 August 2012, he became Aston Villa's Head of European scouting.

Career statistics

References

1957 births
Living people
People from Paderborn (district)
Sportspeople from Detmold (region)
German footballers
SC Paderborn 07 players
SG Wattenscheid 09 players
FC Gütersloh 2000 players
2. Bundesliga players
German football managers
FC Bayern Munich non-playing staff
1. FC Kaiserslautern managers
FC Gütersloh 2000 managers
1. FC Saarbrücken managers
Audi Sport TT Cup drivers
Association football midfielders
Borussia Dortmund II managers
Footballers from North Rhine-Westphalia
SV Lippstadt 08 players
Shanghai Shenhua F.C. non-playing staff